Howard L. Lance (born December 15, 1955, in East Peoria, Illinois) is an executive advisor at The Blackstone Group.

On April 14, 2016, Lance was named as president and chief executive officer of MacDonald, Dettwiler and Associates (MDA) effective May 16, 2016. In 2017, MDA became Maxar Technologies. On January 14, 2019, Maxar announced that Lance had "resigned from his roles as President and Chief Executive Officer and as a Director of Maxar."

Education 
Lance holds an M.S. in management from the Krannert Graduate School of Management at Purdue University and a B.S. in industrial engineering from Bradley University.

Previous work experience 
Lance was appointed president and chief executive officer of Harris Corporation as well as chairman of the board on January 20, 2003. On November 1, 2011, Lance retired from Harris Corp. and was succeeded by William H. Brown.

Before joining Harris, Lance was president of NCR Corporation and chief operating officer of its Retail and Financial Group. Previously, he spent 17 years with Emerson Electric Co., where he held a number of senior management positions, including executive vice president of its electronics and telecommunications segment; chief executive officer and director of its Astec PLC electronics subsidiary in Hong Kong; group vice president of its climate technologies business segment; and president of its Copeland Refrigeration division.

Earlier, Lance held sales and marketing assignments with the Scott-Fetzer Company and Caterpillar Inc., where he began his career in an engineering co-op program. He earned an M.S. degree in management from the Krannert Graduate School of Management at Purdue University and a B.S. degree in industrial engineering from Bradley University.

Honors and awards
 Lance received AeA's Abacus Award as Florida's High-Tech Exec of the Year in January 2006.
 Lance was Named "Best Chairman" at Fourth Annual American Business Awards in June 2006.
 Lance received honorary Doctor of Science degrees from the University of Central Florida and the University of Florida.

Articles 
BusinessWeek CEO Profile

Video
Lance Interviewed on Bloomberg Television - June 12, 2006
Lance Interviewed on Bloomberg Television - August 20, 2009
Lance interviewed on CNBC Power Lunch - October 1, 2009

References 

American chief executives of manufacturing companies
Living people
1955 births
Bradley University alumni
Krannert School of Management alumni
People from East Peoria, Illinois
NCR Corporation people
American technology chief executives